Valette may refer to:

People 
Aline Valette (1850–1899), French feminist and socialist
Craig Valette (born 1982), Canadian ice hockey player
Fanny Valette (born 1986), French actress
Jean Parisot de Valette (1495–1568), French nobleman and 49th Grand Master of the Order of Malta
Michel Valette (1928–2016), French actor and writer
Pierre Adolphe Valette (1876–1942), French Impressionist painter
Spyridon Valettas (1779-1843), Greek politician

Other uses 
 Valette, Cantal, a commune in the Cantal department in south-central France
 Oral contraceptive produced by Jenapharm containing ethinylestradiol and dienogest